Per Anders Daun (born 20 April 1963 in Borås, Västra Götaland) is a Swedish former ski jumper who competed from 1980 to 1988. He finished seventh in the team large hill vent at the 1988 Winter Olympics in Calgary.

Daun's best World Cup career finish was eighth in a large hill event in Norway in 1982.

External links

1963 births
Living people
Ski jumpers at the 1988 Winter Olympics
Swedish male ski jumpers
Olympic ski jumpers of Sweden
People from Borås
Sportspeople from Västra Götaland County
20th-century Swedish people